The 2022 PDC Winmau Challenge Tour consisted of 24 darts tournaments on the 2022 PDC Pro Tour.

Prize money
The prize money for the Challenge Tour events remained the same from 2021, with each event having a prize fund of £10,000.

This is how the prize money is divided:

January

Challenge Tour 1  
Challenge Tour 1 was contested on Friday 21 January 2022 at the Marshall Arena in Milton Keynes.

Challenge Tour 2 
Challenge Tour 2 was contested on Friday 21 January 2022 at the Marshall Arena in Milton Keynes.

Challenge Tour 3 
Challenge Tour 3 was contested on Saturday 22 January 2022 at the Marshall Arena in Milton Keynes.

Challenge Tour 4 
Challenge Tour 4 was contested on Saturday 22 January 2022 at the Marshall Arena in Milton Keynes.

Challenge Tour 5 
Challenge Tour 5 was contested on Sunday 23 January 2022 at the Marshall Arena in Milton Keynes.

April

Challenge Tour 6 
Challenge Tour 6 was contested on Friday 1 April 2022 at the Halle 39 in Hildesheim.

Challenge Tour 7 
Challenge Tour 7 was contested on Friday 1 April 2022 at the Halle 39 in Hildesheim.

Challenge Tour 8 
Challenge Tour 8 was contested on Saturday 2 April 2022 at the Halle 39 in Hildesheim.

Challenge Tour 9 
Challenge Tour 9 was contested on Saturday 2 April 2022 at the Halle 39 in Hildesheim.

Challenge Tour 10 
Challenge Tour 10 was contested on Sunday 3 April 2022 at the Halle 39 in Hildesheim.

July

Challenge Tour 11 
Challenge Tour 11 was contested on Friday 15 July 2022 at the Halle 39 in Hildesheim.

Challenge Tour 12 
Challenge Tour 12 was contested on Friday 15 July 2022 at the Halle 39 in Hildesheim.

Challenge Tour 13 
Challenge Tour 13 was contested on Saturday 16 July 2022 at the Halle 39 in Hildesheim.

Challenge Tour 14 
Challenge Tour 14 was contested on Saturday 16 July 2022 at the Halle 39 in Hildesheim.

Challenge Tour 15 
Challenge Tour 15 was contested on Sunday 17 July 2022 at the Halle 39 in Hildesheim.

September

Challenge Tour 16 
Challenge Tour 16 was contested on Friday 16 September 2022 at the Morningside Arena in Leicester.

Challenge Tour 17 
Challenge Tour 17 was contested on Friday 16 September 2022 at the Morningside Arena in Leicester.

Challenge Tour 18 
Challenge Tour 18 was contested on Saturday 17 September 2022 at the Morningside Arena in Leicester.

Challenge Tour 19 
Challenge Tour 19 was contested on Saturday 17 September 2022 at the Morningside Arena in Leicester.

Challenge Tour 20 
Challenge Tour 20 was contested on Sunday 18 September 2022 at the Morningside Arena in Leicester.

October

Challenge Tour 21 
Challenge Tour 21 was contested on Saturday 15 October 2022 at the Morningside Arena in Leicester.

Challenge Tour 22 
Challenge Tour 22 was contested on Saturday 15 October 2022 at the Morningside Arena in Leicester.

Challenge Tour 23 
Challenge Tour 23 was contested on Sunday 16 October 2022 at the Morningside Arena in Leicester.

Challenge Tour 24 
Challenge Tour 24 was contested on Sunday 16 October 2022 at the Morningside Arena in Leicester.

References

2022 in darts
2022 PDC Pro Tour